The 1995 UEFA Champions League final was the 40th edition and took place in Vienna between Ajax and Milan. It was a rematch of the 1969 European Cup final and Milan's third consecutive UEFA Champions League final, a feat which has since been matched in the Champions League era by Juventus between 1996 and 1998 and Real Madrid between 2016 and 2018. Milan was also aiming to tie Real Madrid's record of having won the European Cup/UEFA Champions League six times. After 85 minutes, the deadlock was broken when Ajax striker Patrick Kluivert, aged 18 years and 327 days, became the youngest player to score in a UEFA Champions League final.

Teams
In the following table, finals until 1992 were in the European Cup era, since 1993 were in the UEFA Champions League era.

Road to final

* Milan were docked two points for crowd trouble against Casino Salzburg on Matchday Two.

Match

Details

See also
1969 European Cup final – contested by the same teams
1995 UEFA Super Cup
1994–95 A.C. Milan season
1994–95 AFC Ajax season
A.C. Milan in European football
AFC Ajax in European football

References

External links
UEFA Champions League 1994/1995 season at UEFA.com

Champions League Final
Champions League Final
European Cup Final 1995
European Cup Final 1995
1995
Final
UEFA Champions League finals
1990s in Vienna
Sports competitions in Vienna
May 1995 sports events in Europe